British dance band is a genre of popular jazz and dance music that developed in British dance halls and hotel ballrooms during the 1920s and 1930s, often called a Golden Age of British music, prior to the Second World War.

Thousands of miles away from the origins of jazz in the United States, British dance bands of this era typically played melodic, good-time music that had jazz and big band influences but also maintained a peculiarly British sense of rhythm and style which came from the music hall tradition. Often comedians of the day or music hall personalities would sing novelty recordings backed by well-known British dance band leaders. Some of the British dance band leaders and musicians went on to fame in the United States in the swing era. 

Thanks to Britain's continuing ballroom dancing tradition and its recording copyright laws, British dance music of the pre-swing era still attracts a modest audience, which American dance music of the same period does not.

Notable band leaders 
Famous British dance band leaders and musicians included (see also List of British dance band leaders for a more comprehensive list):

 Bert Ambrose
 Billy Cotton
 Roy Fox
 Geraldo
 Carroll Gibbons
 Nat Gonella

 Henry Hall
 Jack Hylton
 Jack Jackson
 Charlie Kunz
 Sydney Kyte

 Brian Lawrance
 Sydney Lipton
 Joe Loss
 Ray Noble
 Jack Payne
 Lou Preager

 Harry Roy
 Debroy Somers
 Lew Stone
 Maurice Winnick
 Eric Winstone

Notable musicians 
Notable musicians who performed with British dance bands included:

 Billy Amstell
 George Chisholm
 Harry Lewis
 Tommy McQuater
 Ivor Moreton and Dave Kaye
 Wally Stott

Notable vocalists 
Many popular singers rose to fame as vocalists on recordings by the British dance bands. They are not always attributed on the record label, except for the description "with vocal refrain", but an experienced listener can usually identify the voices of these otherwise anonymous singers. Famous British dance band vocalists included:

 Al Bowlly
 Alan Breeze
 Sam Browne
 Elsie Carlisle
 Helen Clare
 Sam Costa

 Evelyn Dall
 Frances Day
 Denny Dennis
 Chick Henderson
 Mary Lee

 Anne Lenner
 Vera Lynn
 Pat McCormack
 Pat O'Malley
 Bob and Alf Pearson

 Val Rosing
 Anne Shelton
 Dorothy Squires

British service dance bands 
The Squadronaires are a Royal Air Force band which became the best known of the British service dance bands during the Second World War, with hits like "There's Something in the Air" and "South Rampart Street Parade". They played at dances and concerts for service personnel, broadcast on the BBC and recorded on the Decca label. Many of the members formerly played as side men in Bert Ambrose’s band, and they continued to be popular after the war under the leadership of Ronnie Aldrich. Other British service dance bands included the Blue Mariners, the Blue Rockets and the Skyrockets.

Notable venues 
Cafés, clubs, hotels and restaurants in London noted for British dance band music during the Golden Age included:

 The Ambassadors Club, Conduit Street
 The Astoria Ballroom, 157, Charing Cross Road, WC2
 The Bat Club
 The Bag O'Nails, Kingly Street
 Berkeley Hotel, Piccadilly
 Café Anglais, Leicester Square
 Café de Paris, Coventry Street
 Carlton Hotel, 90, Belgrave Road, Victoria
 Casani Club, Imperial House, Regent Street
 Hotel Cecil, Strand
 Ciro's Club, Orange Street, off Haymarket
 Devonshire House, Piccadilly
 The Dorchester, Park Lane
 Embassy Club, Old Bond Street

 Fischer's Restaurant, Bond Street
 Grosvenor House Hotel, Park Lane
 Hatchettes, Piccadilly
 Hollywood restaurant, Piccadilly
 Kit-Cat Club, Haymarket
 Monseigneur Grill restaurant, 16-17 Jermyn Street, SW1
 The May Fair, Berkeley Square
 Murray's Club, Beak Street
 New Princes, Piccadilly
 Piccadilly Hotel, Piccadilly
 Quaglino's, Bury Street
 Romano's, Strand
 Savoy Hotel, Strand
 The Waldorf Hilton, London, Aldwych

In popular culture 
 The 1935 British musical comedy film She Shall Have Music, featured Jack Hylton as himself in a speaking role, and his orchestra.
 The 1937 British musical comedy film Calling All Stars featured Bert Ambrose, Carroll Gibbons and Evelyn Dall.
 The 1938 British musical comedy film Kicking the Moon Around featured Bert Ambrose and Evelyn Dall.
 The BBC Radio programme Dance Band Days ran from 1969 to 1995 with a playlist of British dance band music. It was presented by Alan Dell, and subsequently by Malcolm Laycock. The programme was later transferred to Sunday Night at 10, until the British dance band content was dropped by the BBC in 2008.
 The BBC Radio programme Thanks For The Memory, presented by Hubert Gregg, regularly featured British dance band music, and ran for 35 years until his death in 2004.
 The English television dramatist Dennis Potter was responsible for repopularizing music from the British dance band era in several of his works, with his actors miming period songs in Pennies From Heaven (1978) and The Singing Detective (1986).

See also 
 List of British dance band leaders

References

Further reading 
 James Nott, Going to the Palais: a social and cultural history of dancing and dance halls in Britain, 1918-1960 (OUP, 2015)
 James Nott, Music for the People: Popular Music and Dance in interwar Britain(OUP, 2002)
 Abra, Allison. Review of "Going to the palais: a social and cultural history of dancing and dance halls in Britain, 1918–1960." Contemporary British History (Sep 2016) 30#3 pp 432–433.
White, Mark. The Observer's Book of Big Bands: Describing American, British, and European Big Bands, Their Music and Their Musicians [and their vocalists], in The Observer's Series, no. 77. London: F. Warne, 1978. .

External links 

1920s establishments in the United Kingdom
20th-century music genres
British music
Jazz genres